The 2025 FIFA Beach Soccer World Cup will be the 13th edition of the FIFA Beach Soccer World Cup, the premier international beach soccer championship contested by men's national teams of the member associations of FIFA. Overall, this will be the 23rd edition of a world cup in beach soccer since the establishment of the Beach Soccer World Championships which ran from 1995 to 2004 but was not governed by FIFA. This will be the eight tournament to take place biennially; the World Cup took place annually until 2009.

It will take place in Seychelles. This will be the first time that Seychelles has hosted a FIFA tournament. This will also be the first tournament to be hosted in Africa.

Host selection
The original bidding schedule to determine the hosts was as follows:

 6 October 2021 – FIFA opens the bidding process.
 29 October 2021 – Deadline for national associations to declare interest of hosting to FIFA.
 1 November 2021 – FIFA circulates documents detailing the application campaign and conditions of participation to the bidding associations to analyze.
 26 November 2021 – Deadline for associations to reaffirm their bidding intentions by agreeing to the terms of the documents.
 30 January 2022 – Deadline for nations to prepare and submit their complete bidding packages to be evaluated by FIFA.
 31 March 2022 – Hosts announced by FIFA.

On 8 December 2021, FIFA revealed that five associations had affirmed their bidding intentions:

  (Bahrain Football Association)
  (Colombian Football Federation)
  (Seychelles Football Federation)
  (Football Association of Thailand)
  (United Arab Emirates Football Association)

On 14 February 2022, FIFA announced that three of the five associations had submitted bids through to the final stage of the process, with Colombia and Thailand withdrawing.

Confirmation of the awarding of hosting rights was due to be announced at the FIFA Council meeting in Doha, Qatar on 31 March 2022. However, no announcement was made; it was then due to be awarded at its meeting in Auckland, New Zealand on 22 October 2022, but it was announced at the meeting that the decision had been deferred again until a subsequent Council meeting. On 16 December 2022, the United Arab Emirates was awarded the hosting rights for the 2023 tournament, and the Seychelles for the 2025 tournament.

Qualification
Seychelles will qualify automatically as hosts. This will be their first appearance. Its expected that 16 teams will play at the tournament. 

The process of qualification to the World Cup finals will begin in 2024 and end in 2025.

Note: The appearance statistics below refer only to the FIFA era of world cups in beach soccer (since 2005); see this article for the inclusion of World Championships era stats (1995–2004).

References

External links
 , at FIFA.com
 Beach Soccer Worldwide, official website

2025

Scheduled association football competitions